Jianghu is a Chinese slang term that generally refers to the milieu, social dynamics and/or political paradigm in which many Chinese wuxia, outlaw fiction and romantic fantasy stories are set. The term is used flexibly, and can be used to describe a fictionalized version of rural historical China (usually using loose influences from across the ~1000 BC–280 AD period); a setting of feuding martial arts clans and the people of that community; a secret and possibly criminal underworld; a general sense of the "mythic world" where fantastical stories happen; or some combination thereof.

Etymology 
The original meaning of jianghu comes from "river" and "lake", which might have originally referred to the Yangtze River and Dongting Lake (or Lake Tai), and in a wider sense refers to the wilderness and rural areas in general. These regions are usually overseen by local gentries (if there are any) at best, and are outside the direct administrative capacity of local magistrates and law enforcement, and thus are seen by many (particularly outlaws) as a "free world" where anyone can hide and anything can be done.

Background 
In modern Chinese culture, jianghu is commonly accepted as an alternative universe coexisting with the actual historical one in which the context of the wuxia genre was set. Unlike the normal world, in the jianghu xia (wanderers or knight-errants) are free to act on their own initiative, including with violence, to punish evil and foes, and to reward goodness and allies. While the term literally means "rivers and lakes", it is broader than that: roads, inns, bandit lairs, deserted temples, and the wilderness are all classic places associated with the jianghu, places far from government interference. Vigilantism is normal and accepted in a way that would be impermissible in a more realistic setting. Different wuxia novels have their own versions of the jianghu and its implications. Authors vary on whether they have one consistent setting or reinvest the jianghu in each work; Jin Yong's Condor Trilogy has one continuity, whereas Gu Long's jianghu would be distinct in every novel, for two examples.

One of the most notable sources for helping define what would be thought of as the jianghu was the 14th-century novel Water Margin. In the novel, a band of noble outlaws, who mounted regular sorties in an attempt to right the wrongs of corrupt officials, have retreated to their hideout. These outlaws were called the Chivalrous men of the Green Forests and they then proceed to have various adventures, mixing heroism with more roguish activities.

One of the earliest coinage of jianghu was by a dejected Song dynasty poet Fan Zhongyan (989—1052) in his poem Yueyang Lou Ji, in which the context of jianghu was set out as distant to the courts and temples, meaning a world in its own right.

Evolving interpretations of the term jianghu 
The meaning of the term jianghu has evolved over the course of Chinese history, but usually refers to the martial arts world of ancient China. First coined by Zhuangzi in the late 4th century BC, it referred to a way of life different from that of being actively involved in politics. At the time, it referred to the way of life of underachieving or maligned scholar-officials who distanced themselves from the circles of political power. In this sense, jianghu could be loosely interpreted as the way of life of a hermit.

Over the centuries, jianghu gained greater acceptance among the common people and gradually became a term for a sub-society parallel to, and sometimes orthogonal to, mainstream society. This sub-society initially included merchants, craftsmen, beggars and vagabonds, but over time it assimilated bandits, outlaws and gangs who lived "outside the existing law". During the Song and Yuan dynasties, bards and novelists began using the term jianghu in the process of creating literature covering a fictional society of adventurers and rebels who lived not by existing societal laws, but by their own moral principles or extralegal code of conduct. The core of these moral principles encompassed xia, yi, li, zhong and chou. Stories in this genre bloomed and enriched various interpretations of jianghu. At the same time, the term jianghu also developed intricate interconnections with gang culture because of outlaws' mutually shared distaste towards governments.

The inclusion of martial arts as a feature of jianghu was a recent development in the early 20th century. Novelists started creating a fantasy world of jianghu in which characters are martial artists and in which the characters' enforcement of righteousness is symbolised by conflicts between different martial artists or martial arts schools and the ultimate triumph of good over evil. Martial arts became a tool used by characters in a jianghu story to enforce their moral beliefs. On the other hand, there are characters who become corrupted by power derived from their formidable prowess in martial arts and end up abandoning their morality in their pursuit of power. Around this time, the term jianghu became closely related to a similar term, wulin, which referred exclusively to a community of martial artists. This fantasy world of jianghu remains as the mainstream definition of jianghu in modern Chinese popular culture, particularly wuxia culture.

Current interpretations of the term jianghu 
The following description focuses more on the martial arts aspect of jianghu, its well-established social norms, and its close relation with wulin.

A common aspect of jianghu is that the courts of law are dysfunctional and that all disputes and differences (within the community) can only be resolved by members of the community, through the use of mediation, negotiation or force, predicating the need for the code of xia and acts of chivalry. Law and order within the jianghu are maintained by the various orthodox and righteous schools and heroes. Sometimes these schools may gather to form an alliance against a powerful evil organisation in the jianghu.

A leader, called the wulin mengzhu, is elected from among the schools in order to lead them and ensure law and order within the jianghu. The leader is usually someone with a high level of mastery in martial arts and a great reputation for righteousness who is often involved in some conspiracy and/or killed. In some stories, the leader may not be the greatest martial artist in the jianghu; in other stories, the position of the leader is hereditary. The leader is an arbiter who presides and adjudicates over all inequities and disputes. The leader is a de jure chief justice of the affairs of the jianghu.

Relationship with the government 
Members of the jianghu are also expected to keep their distance from any government offices or officials, without necessarily being antagonistic. It was acceptable for jianghu members who are respectable members of society (usually gentries owning properties or big businesses) to maintain respectful but formal and passive relationships with the officials, such as paying due taxes and attending local community events. Even then, they are expected to shield any fugitives from the law, or at the least not to turn over fugitives to the officials. Local officials who are savvier would know better than to expect co-operation from jianghu members and would refrain from seeking help except to apprehend the worst and most notorious criminals. If the crimes also violated some of the moral tenets of jianghu, jianghu members may assist the government officials.

An interesting aspect is that while senior officials are kept at a distance, jianghu members may freely associate with low-ranking staff such as runners, jailers, or clerks of the magistrates. The jianghu members maintained order among their own in the community and prevent any major disturbance, thus saving a lot of work for their associates in the yamen. In return, the runners turn a blind eye to certain jianghu activities that are officially disapproved, the jailers ensured incarcerated jianghu members are not mistreated, and the clerks pass on useful tips to the jianghu community. This reciprocal arrangement allowed their superiors to maintain order in their jurisdiction with the limited resources available and jianghu members greater freedom.

Norms of the jianghu 

Although many jianghu members were Confucian-educated, their attitudes towards the way of life in the jianghu is largely overshadowed by pragmatism. In other words, they feel that Confucian values are to be respected and upheld if they are useful, and to be discarded if they are a hindrance.

The basic (spoken and unspoken) norms of the jianghu are:
 No using of dirty tricks such as eye-gouging during fights unless one has a personal feud with the opponent.
 Personal feuds do not extend to family members.
 Always show respect for seniors and elders according to their status or age.
 Complete obedience to one's shifu (martial arts master).
 No learning of martial arts from another person without prior permission from one's shifu.
 No using of martial arts against those who are not trained in martial arts.
 No violating of women.
 No sexual relationships with the wives of friends.
 One's word is one's bond.

Usage in modern times 
The term jianghu is linked to cultures other than those pertaining to martial arts in wuxia stories. It is also applied to anarchic societies. For instance, the triads and other Chinese secret societies use the term jianghu to describe their world of organised crime. Sometimes, the term jianghu may be replaced by the term "underworld" à la "criminal underworld".

In modern terminology, jianghu may mean any circle of interest, ranging from the entertainment industry to sports to even politics and the business circle. Colloquially, retirement is also referred to as "leaving the jianghu". In wuxia stories, when reputable figures decide to retire from the jianghu, they will do so in a ceremony known as "washing hands in the golden basin": they wash their hands in a golden basin filled with water, signifying that they will no longer be involved in the affairs of the jianghu. When reclusive figures retired from the jianghu reappear, their return is described as "re-entering the jianghu". Another common expression to describe the disappointment, frustration and involuntariness one might have experienced during everyday work goes as "[when] one is in the jianghu, his body (i.e. action) is not up to himself (人在江湖，身不由己)".

References 

Chinese literature
Wuxia
Fictional regions